Walter E. Cazen (September 29, 1911 – May 7, 1946) was a professional baseball player. An outfielder, Cazen played his entire career in minor league baseball.

Hall of Fame
Cazen played from 1931 through 1945. He played in the International League for eight seasons as a member of the Baltimore Orioles, Rochester Red Wings, and Syracuse Chiefs. He set Chiefs records for stolen bases in a career (140) and for a single season (74), and the single season hits record. In December 1945, Cazen was diagnosed with tuberculosis. He died the following May.

In 2002, he was named to the Syracuse Baseball Wall of Fame. He was inducted into the International League Hall of Fame in 2009.

References

External links

1911 births
1946 deaths
Sportspeople from Niagara Falls, New York
Baseball players from New York (state)
Minor league baseball players
20th-century deaths from tuberculosis
Tuberculosis deaths in New York (state)